Robert Redd (born September 1, 1980) is an American football wide receiver for the Florida Tarpons of the American Arena League (AAL).

Early life
Redd attended Wayne High School in Huber Heights, Ohio, where he compiled 152 career catches for 2,007 yards and 27 touchdowns. He was named the co-offensive player of the year by the Dayton Daily News his junior season, when he led the state with 75 catches for 1,095 yards and 17 scores. He also played running back and cornerback, while returning punts and kickoffs.

College career
Redd played collegiately at Bowling Green State University from 1998–2002, continuing a family tradition of playing for the Falcons set by his two uncles (Ronnie Redd and Raymond (Sarge) D. Redd Jr.).  He was a two-time All-MAC selection and registered 211 career receptions for 2,726 yards and 26 touchdowns. As a senior, he led the team and ranked 10th in the nation with 83 catches. He also set a school record for receiving yards in a game (215 vs Marshall) during his junior campaign.

Professional career

Indianapolis Colts
Originally signed as a rookie free agent and attended training camp with the Indianapolis Colts in 2003.

Philadelphia Eagles
In 2005, Redd had an opportunity to make the Philadelphia Eagles. He participated in preseason games, but he failed to make the roster.

Atlanta Falcons
In 2006, Robert tried out for the Atlanta Falcons, and was released in training camp.

Berlin Thunder

2003
The Colts assigned Redd to play for the Berlin Thunder, of NFL Europe, in 2003 after he was released from training camp.

2005
After failing to make the Eagles after the preseason, Redd was once again assigned to the Thunder, where he helped lead them to an appearance in the World Bowl, where he had 7 catches for 102 yards and a touchdown.

2006
Redd was once again assigned to the Thunder after failing to make the Falcons in 2006.

Colorado Crush
In 2004, Redd agreed to play with the Colorado Crush. Redd saw action in the final 5 games, where he saw great production.

He returned to the Crush in 2007, where he had his best career year in the AFL to that point.

Cleveland Gladiators
In 2008, Redd joined the close to home Cleveland Gladiators. There he was the Gladiators leading receiver, as well as threw for a touchdown, and rushed for a touchdown, while also having an interception while playing defense.

He returned to the Gladiators in 2011, where he was 4th on the team in receiving, and the team achieved a playoff berth.

Bloomington Extreme
In 2009, the AFL had folded, so Redd signed with the Bloomington Extreme of the newly formed Indoor Football League. He spent just 5 games with the Extreme, but was still the team's 3rd leading receiver, and tied for 3rd on the team with 6 touchdowns.

Billings Outlaws
He finished the 2009 season with the Billings Outlaws. He played in 9 games and was 2nd on the team in receptions, receiving yards, and receiving touchdowns. The team went on to win the IFL Title.

Spokane Shock
In 2010, it was announced that Redd had signed with the Spokane Shock in the reformed AFL, but he was released 2 months later.

Cincinnati Commandos
After his release, Redd signed with the Cincinnati Commandos of the Continental Indoor Football League (CIFL). He went on to be 5th in the league in receiving, and the Commandos went 9-1 in the regular season. The Commandos went on to win the CIFL Championship Game.

Owensboro Rage
Following the completion of the 2012 AFL season, Redd signed with the Owensboro Rage of the CIFL.

Dayton Sharks
Redd signed with the Dayton Sharks in 2013, where he earned 1st team All-CIFL honors.

Philadelphia Soul
After starting the 2014 season with Dayton again, Redd was assigned to the Philadelphia Soul on March 18, 2014.

References

Living people
American football wide receivers
Atlanta Falcons players
Philadelphia Eagles players
Indianapolis Colts players
Colorado Crush players
Cincinnati Commandos players
Billings Outlaws players
Bloomington Extreme players
Cleveland Gladiators players
Bowling Green Falcons football players
Owensboro Rage players
Dayton Sharks players
Philadelphia Soul players
Nashville Venom players
1980 births
Northern Kentucky Nightmare players
Florida Tarpons players
People from Huber Heights, Ohio
Players of American football from Dayton, Ohio